The Qilu Evening News, based in Jinan, Shandong Province, People's Republic of China, is a daily broadsheet newspaper. It is one of the most circulated newspapers in the world according to China Daily; the newspaper has a circulation of 1.67 million, making it the fifth most widely circulated daily newspaper in China. 

The Qilu Evening News was founded on 1 January 1988, and its masthead (logo in the case of the online edition) was written in Chinese calligraphy by former paramount leader Deng Xiaoping. It is currently published by Dazhong Newspaper Group, which as of 2011 published eleven other Chinese newspapers. According to the company's official biography, its brand was worth 2.896 billion yuan ( billion) in 2011.

References

External Links
 
Daily newspapers published in China
Chinese-language newspapers (Simplified Chinese)
Mass media in Jinan